USCS Bowditch was a schooner that served as a survey ship in the United States Coast Survey from 1854 to 1874.

Bowditch spent her entire Coast Survey career operating along the United States East Coast.

References
NOAA History, A Science Odyssey: Tools of the Trade: Ships: Coast and Geodetic Survey Ships: Bowditch

Ships of the United States Coast Survey
Schooners of the United States
1854 ships